Freestyle skiing has been contested at the Winter Olympic Games since the 1992 Winter Games in Albertville, France.

Summary

History

Freestyle skiing was a demonstration sport at the 1988 Winter Olympics, with moguls, aerials, and ballet events. Moguls became an official medal sport at the 1992 games, while aerials and ballet were still demonstration events. At the 1994 games, aerials also became an official medal event and the ski ballet competition was dropped. For the 2010 Winter Olympics, ski cross was added to the program while for the 2014 Winter Olympics half-pipe and slopestyle were added.

Alexandre Bilodeau became the first freestyle skiing gold medalist to defend his Olympic title, and first repeat gold medalist, winning the men's moguls at the 2014 Sochi Winter Olympics, having previously won the same event at the 2010 Vancouver Winter Olympics.

Events

Men's
• = official event, (d) = demonstration event

Women's
• = official event, (d) = demonstration event

Mixed

Medal table 

Sources (after the 2022 Winter Olympics):
Accurate as of 2022 Winter Olympics.

Number of athletes by nation

See also
 Freestyle skiing
 List of Olympic medalists in freestyle skiing
 List of Olympic venues in freestyle skiing
 FIS Freestyle World Ski Championships
 FIS Freestyle Skiing World Cup
 Aerial skiing
 Mogul skiing
 Ski ballet
 Ski cross
 Half-pipe
 Slopestyle

References

External links

 Ottawa Citizen: "Moguls glossary" – 2010 Winter Games
 CanWest News Service: "Ski Cross glossary"  – 2010 Winter Games

 
Sports at the Winter Olympics
Olympics
Skiing at the Winter Olympics